Municipal elections were held in the Czech Republic on 18 and 19 November 1994. Voter turnout was 60.68%.

Results

References

1994
1994 elections in the Czech Republic
November 1994 events in Europe